Ameer Kenneth Webb (born March 19, 1991) is an American sprinter specializing in the 100 m and 200 m.

College career
At Texas A&M Webb was the 200 meter champion at the 2013 NCAA Men's Division I Indoor Track and Field Championships and the 2013 NCAA Division I Outdoor Track and Field Championships.  Prior to Texas A&M he ran for Cerritos College, where he was the 2011 CCCAA State Champion in both the 100 meters and 200 meters.  He had run for Tustin High School, finishing fifth in the 200 meters at the 2009 CIF California State Meet behind Randall Carroll's sweep of both sprinting events. Webb was a dual-sport student-athlete (track & field and football) at Tustin High for all 3 and 1/2 years he attended there. He attended a small charter school during his first semester of his junior year. The charter school had no sports program.  He returned to Tustin for his second semester of his junior year. As a senior, he started both ways and helped lead the football team to its first CIF championship title game in a decade. They eventually fell to a Ronnie Hillman-led La Habra football team.

Professional career
He competed at the 2014 IAAF World Relays in the finals, but due to his involvement in an exchange infraction the team was disqualified.

Webb won the 200 meters at the 2016 Qatar Athletic Super Grand Prix with a meet record of 19.85 (+1.9 m/s). That time ranks him tied with John Capel, Konstadinos Kederis and Nickel Ashmeade as the number 25 performer in history.  He competed at the 2016 Olympics., reaching the semi-finals. On June 25, 2017, Webb won the 200 meters at the 2017 USA Outdoor Track and Field Championships with a time of 20.09 seconds, thus qualifying for the 2017 World Championships in Athletics.

Statistics
Information from IAAF profile or Track & Field Results Reporting System unless otherwise noted.

Personal bests
 = wind-assisted (more than +2.0 m/s)
 = world lead (fastest time in the year)

International championship results
 = personal best

National championship results
 = wind-assisted (more than +2.0 m/s)
 = personal best
 = seasonal best

200 m circuit wins
Representing Nike
IAAF Diamond League
Doha: 2016
Rome: 2016
London: 2017

Notes

References

External links

 
 
 
 
 

Living people
1991 births
People from Carson, California
Sportspeople from Los Angeles County, California
Track and field athletes from California
American male sprinters
African-American male track and field athletes
Texas A&M Aggies men's track and field athletes
Athletes (track and field) at the 2016 Summer Olympics
Olympic track and field athletes of the United States
World Athletics Championships athletes for the United States
USA Outdoor Track and Field Championships winners
21st-century African-American sportspeople